The 2012 Moosehead Fall Open was held from September 19 to 23 at the RCMP Curling Club in Ottawa as part of the 2012–13 Ontario Curling Tour. The event was held in a round robin format, with the purse for the men's event being CAD$16,000, and CAD $7,200 for the women's event.

Men

Teams

Round Robin Standings

Playoffs

Women

Teams

Round Robin Standings

Playoffs

External links

Moosehead Fall Open
2012 in Ontario
Curling in Ottawa
September 2012 sports events in Canada